Christian Massé (27 August 1951 – 1 January 2021) was a French writer. He sometimes wrote under the pseudonym Julien Viaud and published in the journals Plaisir d'écrire of Perpignan and Le Jardin d'Essai of Paris.

Publications
Être noir à Jean-Jaurès (1997)
Le drôle-au-diable (2001)
La mesure du temps : anthologie (2004)
La Loire dans tous ses ébats ou Une déambulation autour de la crue de Bréhémont en 1856 : nouvelle ligérienne (2007)
La dernière nuit de Josepha Saint-Amand (2009)
La colère des imbéciles remplit le monde ! : opuscule (2013)
Et « Siroco » nous était conté ? (2013)

Under the Pseudonym Julien Viaud
Les Genêts (1986)
Les rocs et les cendres (1995)

References

1951 births
2021 deaths
French writers